Krushë e Madhe is a village in the Rahovec municipality of western Kosovo. With a population of around 7,000, it is the second largest village in Kosovo. During the Kosovo War, the village was a stronghold of the Kosovo Liberation Army. On 25 March 1999, it was the site of a massacre by the Army of Serbia and Montenegro in which 205 Kosovo Albanian civilians were killed.

Notes

References

Villages in Orahovac